The Wijetunga cabinet was the central government of Sri Lanka led by President D. B. Wijetunga between 1993 and 1994. It was formed in May 1993 after the assassination of Wijetunga's predecessor Ranasinghe Premadasa and it ended in November 1994 when Wijetunga chose not to contest in the 1994 presidential election. The Wijetunga cabinet saw Sri Lanka's first cohabitation government following the opposition People's Alliance's victory in the 1994 general election.

Cabinet members (UNP Government 1993-1994)

Cabinet members (SLFP Government 1994)

Notes

References

1993 establishments in Sri Lanka
1994 disestablishments in Sri Lanka
Cabinets disestablished in 1993
Cabinet of Sri Lanka